Kingston Mines is a village in Peoria County, Illinois, United States. The population was 259 at the 2000 census. It is part of the Peoria, Illinois Metropolitan Statistical Area.   Located on the Illinois River, it was a shipping port, loading coal from the nearby mines (the largest nearby mine was called, Kingston).

Geography
Kingston Mines is located at  (40.558101, -89.771990).

Demographics

As of the census of 2000, there were 259 people, 98 households, and 68 families residing in the village. The racial makeup of the village was 95.75% White, 2.32% from other races, and 1.93% from two or more races. Hispanic or Latino of any race were 3.09% of the population.

There were 98 households, out of which 29.6% had children under the age of 18 living with them, 56.1% were married couples living together, 11.2% had a female householder with no husband present, and 29.6% were non-families. 26.5% of all households were made up of individuals, and 14.3% had someone living alone who was 65 years of age or older. The average household size was 2.64 and the average family size was 3.20.

In the village, the population was spread out, with 23.2% under the age of 18, 12.4% from 18 to 24, 27.4% from 25 to 44, 21.2% from 45 to 64, and 15.8% who were 65 years of age or older. The median age was 35 years. For every 100 females, there were 105.6 males. For every 100 females age 18 and over, there were 101.0 males.

The median income for a household in the village was $31,250, and the median income for a family was $45,556. Males had a median income of $26,000 versus $21,875 for females. The per capita income for the village was $14,908. About 2.9% of families and 5.2% of the population were below the poverty line, including 7.8% of those under the age of eighteen and none of those 65 or over.

References

Villages in Peoria County, Illinois
Villages in Illinois
Peoria metropolitan area, Illinois